HKR may refer to:

 Hakor, Egyptian pharaoh of the 29th Dynasty
 Hawkesbury River railway station, in New South Wales, Australia
 Hrvatski katolički radio, a Croatian radio network
 Hull Kingston Rovers, a British rugby league club
 HKR International, a Hong Kong land developer